The Salisbury District Brigade was an administrative division of the North Carolina militia during the American Revolutionary War (1776–1783).  This unit was established by the Fourth North Carolina Provincial Congress on May 4, 1776, and disbanded at the end of the war.

History

In August 1775, the Third Provincial Congress of North Carolina delegates appointed Cornelius Harnett the head of the Council of Safety which oversaw resistance to British rule. They also divided the colony into six military districts for the purpose of organizing militia and arranging representation in the executive body.  The Salisbury District was one of these districts, which eventually led to the creation of the Salisbury District Brigade.  At the county level, there were Committees of Safety, including the Rowan, Anson, Mecklenburg, Surry, and Tryon county committees of safety.  Many members of the Rowan committee of safety became the officers of the regiments of the Salisbury District Brigade.

Griffith Rutherford was from Rowan County, North Carolina.  He was commissioned as a Colonel and commandant of the Rowan County Regiment on September 9, 1775.  On December 21, 1775, the North Carolina Provincial Congress split the Salisbury District into two separate regiments of minutemen—the 1st Battalion of Salisbury District Minutemen and the 2nd Battalion of Salisbury District Minutemen. Colonel Rutherford was assigned as commandant of the 1st Battalion, along with Colonel Thomas Wade.  The 1st Battalion participated in one engagement, the Battle of Moore's Creek Bridge on February 27, 1776. Colonel Thomas Polk was commandant of the 2nd Battalion.  The 2nd Battalion participated in the Battle of Great Cane Brake on  December 22, 1775, the Snow Campaign on December 23, 1775 to December 30, 1775, and the Battle of Moore's Creek Bridge on February 27, 1776.

The minutemen battalions were considered "state troops" vice local militia.  On April 10, 1776, the two battalions of minutemen regiments were disbanded in favor of local militia brigades and subordinate regiments.  There were eventually six militia brigades by the end of the war.  On April 22, 1776, Rutherford was commissioned as a brigadier general and assigned as the commandant of the Salisbury District Brigade that was established officially on May 4, 1776. Colonel Matthew Locke took over as commandant of the Rowan County Regiment.

Commandants
Commandants of the Salisbury District Brigade and their dates of service were as follows:
 Brigadier General Griffith Rutherford was commandant from 1776 to 1783. At the Battle of Camden on August 16, 1780, he was taken POW and remained in British custody and imprisoned in Saint Augustine, Florida until he was released in a prisoner exchange in July 1781 and returned to service in September 1781. During his absence from duty, generals pro tempore filled in as commandants in the rank of general pro tempore.  
 Brigadier General Matthew Locke was general pro tempore for a few months in 1779 while General Rutherford was in South Carolina for the Purrysburg expedition in early 1779.
 Brigadier General Henry William Harrington was general pro tempore from July to December 1780.  The North Carolina Council of State appointed Henry William Harrington as brigadier general (pro tempore) to lead the Salisbury District Brigade while general Rutherford was sent to South Carolina to join up with components of the Southern Department. Brigadier General (pro temp) Henry William Harrington resigned his commission in November 1780.
 Brigadier General William Lee Davidson was general pro tempore from September 1780 to February 1781.  He was commissioned as brigadier general pro tempore of Militia after Griffith Rutherford was captured at the battle of Camden, South Carolina on August 16, 1780. General Davidson was killed at the Battle of Cowan's Ford in Mecklenburg County, North Carolina on February 1, 1781 while opposing the re-entry of Cornwallis into North Carolina. 
 Brigadier General Andrew Pickens was general pro tempore from February to March 1781.  The colonels of the Salisbury District "elected" Andrew Pickens to replace Davidson.  Pickens was a newly appointed general in the South Carolina militia and did not have an active assignment.  However, general Pickens returned to the South Carolina militia in March and Colonel Ambrose Ramsey replaced him for the Battle of Guilford Courthouse.
 Brigadier General Ambrose Ramsey was general pro tempore on March 15, 1781 for the Battle of Guilford Courthouse, after which he returned to his assignment as colonel/commandant of the Chatham County Regiment.

Regiments 
The following regiments were subordinate to the Salisbury District Brigade.  The date regiments were established and disbanded are shown.  Those regiments marked with a "+" were transferred to the newly-created Morgan District Brigade of Militia in May 1782.  The Washington County Regiment was called initially the Washington District Regiment until Washington County was created from Washington District.  The 2nd Rowan County Regiment's name was changed to the "Burke County Regiment" in 1777 and then back to "2nd Rowan County Regiment" in 1782.

Anson County Regiment (1775–1783)
Burke County Regiment+ (1777–1782)
Guilford County Regiment (1775–1783)
Lincoln County Regiment+ (1779–1783)
Mecklenburg County Regiment (1775–1783)
2nd Mecklenburg County Regiment (1779–1780)
Montgomery County Regiment (1779–1783)
Richmond County Regiment (1779–1783)
Rowan County Regiment (1775–1783)
2nd Rowan County Regiment (1775–1777, 1782–1783)
Rutherford County Regiment+ (1779–1783)
Sullivan County Regiment+ (1779–1783)
Surry County Regiment (1775–1783)
Tryon County Regiment (1775–1779)
Washington District Regiment (1776–1777)
Washington County Regiment+ (1777–1782)
Wilkes County Regiment+ (1777–1783)

The regiments were made up of male citizens over sixteen years of age. Regiments of militia were called up for service by the governor or the commanding general to serve for a campaign or for a period of time as needed. The soldiers were told what equipment they had to bring with them.

The Brigade was reported to have a size of 1,400 men in 1781 but never more than 2,000 men the remainder of the war.

Engagements

Regiments of the Salisbury District Brigade were involved in 98 known engagements (battles, sieges, and skirmishes), including six in Georgia, 32 in South Carolina, eight in Tennessee, and 52 in North Carolina.  One or more companies of these regiments were involved in each engagement.

Staff
The Salisbury District Brigade had several staff positions.  The forage master, quarter master, and commissary were especially important in providing troops with food and supplies when they were called outside of the Salisbury District in North Carolina.

Forage master
Allin, Thomas (under general William Lee Davidson) 
Quartermaster
Boyd, Benjamin (Quartermaseter General)
Brannon, John (Quartermaseter of Issues)
Carr, Robert
Gamble, Edmund
Gillespie, Thomas (Quartermaster under general Rutherford)
Walker, Andrew
Commissary
Graham, John
Ramsey, David
Scott, John (Issuing Commissary)
Wallace, James
Watson, John (stationed in Salisbury)
Chaplain
Hall, James (uncertain)
Aide-de-Camp
Harris, Thomas
Rutherford, James (son of Griffith Rutherford)
Paymaster
Locke, Matthew
Provisions Contractors
Roper, James
Sheppard, William

See also 
Cherokee–American wars
List of North Carolina militia units in the American Revolution
List of United States militia units in the American Revolutionary War
Rutherford Light Horse expedition
Salisbury District, North Carolina

References

Further reading 

North Carolina Department of Archives and History, North Carolina Revolutionary Army Accounts-Secretary of State Treasurer's and Comptroller's Papers Journal "A" (Public Accounts) 1775–1776.

 

North Carolina militia
1776 establishments in North Carolina
Military units and formations established in 1776
Military units and formations disestablished in 1783